Miloš Janković (born 28 June 1994) is a Serbian professional basketball player for Fribourg Olympic of the Swiss Basketball League.

Professional career
He signed with Metalac Farmakom from Varda HE Višegrad on 24 March 2015. He spent the 2013–14 season in the ABA League playing for Radnički Kragujevac.

On July 7, 2017, he signed with SAM Massagno.

3x3 basketball
Janković won gold medal at the 2012 FIBA 3x3 Under-18 World Championships representing Serbia national 3x3 under-18 team together with Luka Anđušić, Mihajlo Andrić, and Rade Zagorac.

References

External links 
 Profile at aba-liga.com
 Profile at eurobasket.com
 Profile at euroleague.com
 Profile at fiba.com

1994 births
Living people
ABA League players
Basketball League of Serbia players
Basketball players from Čačak
Centers (basketball)
Fribourg Olympic players
KK Dynamic players
KK Metalac Valjevo players
KK Mladost Čačak players
KK Radnički Kragujevac (2009–2014) players
SAM Basket players
Serbian expatriate basketball people in Bosnia and Herzegovina
Serbian expatriate basketball people in Switzerland
Serbian men's basketball players
Serbian men's 3x3 basketball players